Monroe Regional Airport  is a public use airport in Ouachita Parish, Louisiana, United States. The airport is owned by the City of Monroe and is located three nautical miles (6 km) east of its central business district.

It is included in the National Plan of Integrated Airport Systems for 2011–2015, which categorized it as a primary commercial service airport since it has over 10,000 passenger boardings (enplanements) per year. As per Federal Aviation Administration records, the airport had 107,290 enplanements in calendar year 2011, an increase of 6.8% from 100,419 in 2010.

The airport is advertised as the birthplace of Delta Air Lines; the airport's logo is a variant on the Delta logo.

History 
During World War II, the United States Army Air Forces Flying Training Command used the airport as a cadet training center beginning in August 1942. The airfield was named Selman Army Airfield, named after a Navy Pilot, Lieutenant Augustus J. Selman, USN, a native of Monroe, Louisiana, who died in the line of duty at Norfolk, Virginia, on November 28, 1921, of injuries received in an airplane crash.

The vast majority of aircraft flown at Selman AAF were Beech C-45s, also known as the AT-7. BT-13s were flown for basic flying training, and TC-47 and TC-46s were used beginning in late 1944. It closed on until September 1, 1945. After that Selman AAF was used as a separation center for returning overseas personnel until being inactivated on May 31, 1946. The airport was returned to civil control on July 31, 1946.

Monroe was served in the past by several airlines operating mainline jet aircraft. Delta Air Lines operated Boeing 727-200, Boeing 737-200, McDonnell Douglas DC-9-30 and McDonnell Douglas MD-80 jetliner flights to Atlanta, Dallas/Fort Worth, Birmingham, AL and other cities including one stop, no change of plane, direct service to New York City via Newark Airport. Delta operated mainline jet service into Monroe for many years.

Southern Airways served Monroe with Douglas DC-9-10 jet flights to New Orleans, Baton Rouge, Memphis, Chicago, Orlando and other destinations. Southern then merged with North Central Airlines to form Republic Airlines which in turn continued to serve Monroe. Republic operated DC-9 jet service nonstop to Memphis and New Orleans with direct, one stop service to Chicago and also direct, no change of plane, two stop service to Atlanta. Republic was subsequently acquired by Northwest Airlines which in turn then merged with Delta.

In addition, Texas International Airlines (formerly known as Trans-Texas Airways, TTa) operated Convair 600 turboprop service to Houston, Beaumont/Port Arthur, TX and other destinations.

Several regional and commuter airlines served Monroe in the past as well including Royale Airlines which was based in nearby Shreveport and operated hubs at Houston Intercontinental Airport (IAH) and New Orleans International Airport (MSY). Royale operated Grumman Gulfstream I, Beechcraft C99 and Embraer EMB-110 Bandeirante turboprop aircraft from the airport with nonstop service to Alexandria, LA; Baton Rouge, LA; Memphis, TN; New Orleans, LA and Shreveport, LA as well as one stop, direct service to Houston, TX. L'Express Airlines, another Louisiana-based air carrier, operated Beechcraft turboprop aircraft with nonstop flights to its hub in New Orleans, LA. Northwest Airlink, which was operated by Express Airlines I on behalf of Northwest Airlines, flew Saab 340 and British Aerospace BAe Jetstream 31 turboprops to Memphis.

Currently, all American Eagle, Delta Connection and United Express passenger flights to and from Monroe are operated either with Canadair CRJ or with Embraer ERJ regional jet aircraft.

Facilities and aircraft 
Monroe Regional Airport covers an area of 2,660 acres (1,076 ha) at an elevation of 79 feet (24 m) above mean sea level. It has three runways with asphalt surfaces: 4/22 is 7,505 by 150 feet (2,288 x 46 m); 14/32 is 4,999 by 150 feet (1,524 x 46 m); 18/36 is 5,001 by 150 feet (1,524 x 46 m).

For the 12-month period ending December 31, 2015, the airport had 38,828 aircraft operations, an average of 106 per day: 57% general aviation, 22% military, 20% air taxi, and 1% scheduled commercial. At that time there were 38 aircraft based at this airport: 74% single-engine and 26% multi-engine.

Terminal 
In 2009 Lincoln Builders of Ruston started construction on a new nearly  terminal, which was completed in mid-2011.

In October 2011, part one of a two phase passenger terminal project was completed. The original terminal was demolished and a new passenger terminal was constructed to include a new baggage claim and car rental facility.  The new terminal is located adjacent to the site of the original facility and features new ticket counters, a cocktail lounge and a restaurant that serves breakfast, lunch, and dinner. The new terminal has six gates with four of these gates being equipped with jet bridges.

Airlines and destinations 

The following airlines offer scheduled passenger service:

Cargo airlines 
The following airlines offer scheduled cargo service:

Statistics

See also

 Chennault Aviation and Military Museum

References

External links
 Monroe Regional Airport
 Detailed history of Selman Army Airfield
 
 
 

Airports in Louisiana
Buildings and structures in Ouachita Parish, Louisiana
Monroe, Louisiana
Airports established in 1942
1942 establishments in Louisiana
Transportation in Ouachita Parish, Louisiana